Bush Township is one of nine townships in Boyd County, Nebraska, United States. The Township was named for George H. W. Bush, 41st President of the United States.  The population was 75 at the 2020 census. A 2021 estimate placed the township's population at 74.

The Village of Monowi lies within the Township.

See also
County government in Nebraska

References

External links
City-Data.com

Townships in Boyd County, Nebraska
Townships in Nebraska